The Southwestern Oklahoma State Bulldogs football program represents Southwestern Oklahoma State University in college football and competes in the Division II level of the National Collegiate Athletics Association (NCAA). In 2011, SWOSU became a member of the Great American Conference. Prior to this, Southwestern Oklahoma State was a member of the Lone Star Conference from 1998 to 2010. SWOSU's home games are played at Milam in Weatherford, Oklahoma. The programs maintains an all time record of 471–486–37. The team is led by head coach Chet Pobolish who was hired by the university in November 2017.

Conference affiliations
 1914–1928 Oklahoma Intercollegiate Conference I
 1929–1973 Oklahoma Collegiate Athletic Conference
 1974–1996 Oklahoma Intercollegiate Conference II
 1997–2010 Lone Star Conference
 2011– Great American Conference

Stadium
The Bulldogs have played their home games at Milam Stadium since 1936. The current capacity of the stadium is at 8,600.

Championships

National championships

Conference championships
The Bulldogs have won 17 conference championships, in 1926, 1932, 1933, 1950, 1954, 1955, 1957, 1968, 1969, 1970, 1971, 1974, 1977, 1980, 1985, 1992, 1996.

List of head coaches

References

External links
 

 
American football teams established in 1905
1905 establishments in Oklahoma Territory